is a former Japanese football player. He is the current manager J1 League club of Shonan Bellmare.

Club career
Yamaguchi was born in Sakawa, Kochi on April 17, 1978. He joined JEF United Ichihara (later JEF United Chiba) from youth team in 1996. He debuted on March 20, when he was 17 year and 354 days old. It was the youngest player to play for J1 League until Yuki Abe made new record in 1998. He became a regular player as center back from 1997. He moved to Gamba Osaka in 2001. The club won the champions 2005 J1 League, 2007 J.League Cup, 2008 and 2009 Emperor's Cup. He was also elected Best XI for 3 years in a row (2006-2008). In Asia, in 2008, the club won the champions AFC Champions League and the 3rd place Club World Cup. He returned JEF United Chiba in 2012 and played in 3 seasons. He moved to Kyoto Sanga FC in 2015 and retired end of 2015 season.

National team career
In June 1997, Yamaguchi was selected Japan U-20 national team for 1997 World Youth Championship. He played as right back of 3 back defense with Tsuneyasu Miyamoto and Kazuyuki Toda full time in all 5 matches.

On May 27, 2009, Yamaguchi debuted for Japan national team against Chile. On May 31, he also played against Belgium. He played 2 games for Japan in 2009.

Managerial career
From 2021 season, he will be the assistant coach of Shonan Bellmare on 14 May 2021. On 1 September 2021, Yamaguchi was appointed as manager of J1 club, Shonan Bellmare following the retirement of Bin Ukishima for during 2021 season. After winning his first victory as a manager in the 33rd round against Yokohama FC. On October 23rd at same year, he led the team to remain in the final round of the 38th round against Gamba Osaka on December 4th at same year. It was decided that he would continue to serve as manager in the 2022 season and in June he was awarded the monthly best manager award.

Club statistics

1Includes AFC Champions League and FIFA Club World Cup.
2Includes Japanese Super Cup and Promotion Playoffs to J1.

National team statistics

Managerial statistics

Personal honours
J.League Best XI - 2006, 2007, 2008

Team honours
AFC Champions League - 2008
Pan-Pacific Championship - 2008
J1 League - 2005
Emperor's Cup - 2008, 2009
J.League Cup - 2007
Japanese Super Cup - 2007

References

External links

 
 Japan National Football Team Database
 

1978 births
Living people
Association football people from Kōchi Prefecture
Japanese footballers
Japan youth international footballers
Japan international footballers
J1 League players
J2 League players
JEF United Chiba players
Gamba Osaka players
Kyoto Sanga FC players
Footballers at the 1998 Asian Games
Association football defenders
Asian Games competitors for Japan
J1 League managers
Shonan Bellmare managers